Bahmai-ye Garmsiri may refer to:
 Bahmai-ye Garmsiri District
 Bahmai-ye Garmsiri-ye Jonubi Rural District
 Bahmai-ye Garmsiri-ye Shomali Rural District